Kretz may refer to:

People
 Amélie Kretz (born 1993), Canadian triathlete
 Ed Kretz
 Ed Kretz Jr.
 Eric Kretz (born 1966), American musician
 Jean-Marie Kretz (born 1958), French weightlifter
 Joel Kretz (born 1957), American politician
 Johannes Kretz (born 1968), Austrian composer
 Kate Kretz (born 1963), American artist
 Ludwig Kretz, Austrian cyclist
 Richard Kretz (1865–1920), Austrian pathologist

Places
 Kretz, Rhineland-Palatinate, Germany